The Tlell River is a watercourse on the east side of Graham Island in Haida Gwaii, British Columbia, Canada.   It enters Hecate Strait near the community of Tlell.  It is the second-longest river in Haida Gwaii, after the Yakoun.  Its lower reaches are within Naikoon Provincial Park.  The Tlell's headwaters and the swamps of its upper reaches are protected within the Tlall Conservancy.  The river is popular with anglers, as it supports large coho salmon.

References

Rivers of Haida Gwaii